Crooked Creek is a  tributary of the Owyhee River in the U.S. state of Oregon. Crooked Creek has a  watershed.

See also
List of rivers of Oregon
List of longest streams of Oregon

References

Rivers of Oregon
Rivers of Malheur County, Oregon